Lights Out is a 2016 American supernatural horror film directed by David F. Sandberg in his directorial debut, produced by Lawrence Grey, James Wan, and Eric Heisserer and written by Heisserer. It stars Teresa Palmer, Gabriel Bateman, Billy Burke, and Maria Bello. It is based on Sandberg's 2013 short film of the same name and features Lotta Losten, who starred in the short.

In the film, a young woman must confront her childhood fears to protect her brother from a vengeful supernatural entity holding a mysterious attachment to their mother. After the short film's success, Sandberg announced a feature film adaptation based on his short film. Principal photography for the film began in June 2015 in Los Angeles. Filming was completed on August 5, 2015.

The film had its world premiere at the Los Angeles Film Festival on June 8, 2016, and was released in the United States and Canada on July 22, 2016, by Warner Bros. The film received positive reviews from critics, with many praising the direction, screenplay, acting, cinematography and musical score, and grossed $148million against a budget of $4.9million. A sequel is in development.

Plot 
In a textile factory during closing hours, an employee named Esther encounters a silhouette of a strange woman with claw-like hands when the lights are off, but cannot see it when the lights are on. After she leaves, her boss Paul encounters the woman and tries to run away, but he is killed.

Some time later, Paul's son, Martin, witness his mother, Sophie, talking to something in the dark. As Martin goes back to bed, he notices a strange figure in the shadow behind Sophie, and locks himself in his bedroom out of fear. Martin begins to have trouble with staying awake at school. The nurse is unable to get in touch with Sophie to inform her of this, so Paul's stepdaughter (Martin's older half-sibling) Rebecca is called into the school nurse's office. A Child Protective Services agent questions Rebecca about Martin's living conditions, and Rebecca tells the official that Sophie has depression and is taking antidepressants.

Martin tells his sister that their mother has been talking to a woman named "Diana". Rebecca assures him that Diana is not real, and that she had also heard their mother talk to the imaginary girl when she was a child. Rebecca gets into an argument with Sophie when she realizes her mother is not taking her medication. Sophie tells Rebecca she has no right to lecture her since she also abandoned her like Rebecca's father. Questioning her mother's sanity, Rebecca takes Martin to her apartment, much to Sophie's despair. That night, Rebecca is woken by the same shadowed woman that killed Paul. She narrowly escapes an attack when she turns the lights on, making the woman disappear. The next morning, Rebecca notices that the name "Diana" has been scratched into her floor, along with a scratch drawing of a stick figure. She remembers finding the same name and drawing as a child and realizes Diana is real.

Rebecca finds a box of medical records and research in Paul's office. His findings reveal that her mother was admitted to a mental hospital as a child. While there, she befriended a young patient named Diana. Diana suffered from a severe skin condition that meant she could not go out in sunlight. It was believed that she was evil and was able to "get into people's heads" since Diana's father committed suicide after Diana influenced him to kill himself. In the end, Diana was accidentally killed by the hospital staff when they tried an experimental surgery on her under intense light. Sophie has a conversation with Martin, who was taken back to their mother by the CPS agent, and she decides to allow Martin to meet Diana after turning the light off. However, Martin is fearful and runs away from them.

Rebecca, her boyfriend Bret, and Martin stage an intervention with Sophie about how Sophie is letting Diana haunt them. Sophie becomes irate but secretly asks Rebecca for help, as Diana will not let Sophie go. The group stays the night at Sophie's, intending to get her help in the morning. To avoid an attack from Diana during the night, they rig the house to be as brightly lit as possible. This proves useless when Diana cuts the power to the neighborhood. She traps Rebecca and Martin in the basement and attempts to kill Bret. Despite being injured, Bret escapes by shining the headlight of his car and drives away. In the basement, Martin and Rebecca find a black-light; when Rebecca is using it, she clearly sees Diana with it, but realizes it is not powerful enough to ward her off.

Bret returns with two police officers. When the officers free Martin and Rebecca from the basement, they also see the shadow of Diana and try to go after her, but she kills them. Rebecca and Martin go out, but Martin insists on getting their mom out as well. Rebecca goes back alone for her mother. As she climbs the stairs, Diana tells Rebecca that she killed Rebecca's father years ago. As Diana prepares to kill her, Sophie appears with a gun from one of the dead officers. Sophie has realized she is the tether for Diana to exist in the real world and kills herself to save Rebecca. As Sophie's body falls, Diana vanishes from existence.

After the long night, Bret comforts Martin and Rebecca in an ambulance outside the house, assuring them that Diana is truly gone.

Cast

Production

Development
Sandberg, along with his wife  Lotta Losten, created the initial short film for a film competition. Although the film did not win the competition, the short soon went viral, leading to Sandberg to be contacted by several agents, to the point where he had to develop a spreadsheet to keep track of them all. One of the contacts was Lawrence Grey who wanted to collaborate with James Wan in order to produce a feature-length version. Although Wan enjoyed the short, he was hesitant that it could be turned into a feature until Sandberg produced a treatment for the feature-length version.

The move to Hollywood was somewhat hectic for the couple, requiring that Losten quit her day job in order to do so. Once in Hollywood the two were unable to get an apartment due to not having a US credit score, forcing them to rent Airbnb on a monthly basis.

Sandberg originally based the character of Rebecca on a real girl that he knew who was suffering from depression, and who was engaging in self-harm, which is why Rebecca has scars on her arms, but the development of the film made it less about depression and more of a ghost story in which Diana would have been the real person who died and became a ghost. Wan came up with the idea of making Diana the ghost. Rebecca's boyfriend was also given a twist of being a rocker, but is actually committed and responsible, even driving a safe car like a Volvo. Another twist Sandberg liked was making the imaginary friend for the mother rather than the trope of having the friend be for the child.

Casting
In June 2015, Gabriel Bateman and Teresa Palmer were cast in the film as the child and teenager leads. In that same month, Maria Bello was cast in the film as the mother of Bateman and Palmer's characters, alongside Alexander DiPersia as the boyfriend of Palmer's character, Billy Burke as the stepfather of Palmer's character and father of Bateman's character, and Alicia Vela-Bailey as the main antagonist Diana were also starring.

Filming
Principal photography for the film began in June 2015 in Los Angeles. Filming was completed on August 5, 2015. Sandberg had not worked with a film crew or visited a film set before directing Lights Out; he had to ask the first assistant director, "So when do I say action?"

Special effects
Special effects of having the ghost appear and disappear were mostly done by using a split-screen technique as also used in the short. Sandberg said "Whenever she's in frame with another character, it's basically just a split screen. So you shoot it with her and without her. You turn the camera on with her, you turn it off and she walks off, and then you turn it on again. It's super simple, actually."  Sandberg also made a list of what he called the "light gags", or different ways to create light sources from flashlights to cell phones and gunfire. In the scene when Diana appears in Rebecca's room, James Wan suggested replacing passing car headlights in an early treatment with the flashing neon sign that appears in the final film.

Suicide concerns and ending
After hearing concerns from critics that the ending of the film was promoting suicide, Sandberg interviewed with The A.V. Club where he said he was distressed about that idea, and wanted to explain his position. He said that he originally wanted to make a film about depression, as he has also suffered from it, and that one of his friends had committed suicide. Diana was not a ghost back then, but during the development of the film, it became more of a horror film. It still retained some themes about depression and mental illness. He had originally shot a second ending to the film in which Martin becomes depressed and Diana comes back one more time before she is killed. Test audiences concluded that Sophie's sacrifice would have been in vain.

Release
The film had its world premiere at the Los Angeles Film Festival on  June 8, 2016. The film also screened at Comic-Con on  July 20, 2016, and was  released on  July 22, 2016.

Reception

Box office
Lights Out grossed $67.3 million in the United States and Canada and $81.6 million in other territories for a worldwide total of $148.9 million, against a production budget of $4.9 million.

In North America, Lights Out was projected to gross $13–15 million from 2,900 theaters in its opening weekend. It made $1.8 million from its Thursday night screenings and $9.2 million on its first day. The film exceeded expectations and earned $21.7 million in its opening weekend, finishing at third place behind fellow newcomer Star Trek Beyond and holdover The Secret Life of Pets.

In other territories, the film earned $8.5 million in its opening weekend from 3,737 screens in key markets of Russia and Australia along with 30 smaller Eastern European and Asian markets. The film benefited from being released in the wake of the global success of The Conjuring 2. It debuted at first place in Russia with $1.7 million. Its other top openings were recorded in South Korea ($3.9 million), France ($1.5 million), the U.K. ($1.4 million) and Spain ($1.1 million). Its biggest earning markets are South Korea ($7.7 million), Mexico ($5.5 million), the U.K. ($4.5 million) and Spain ($3.9 million).

Critical response
On review aggregator Rotten Tomatoes the film has an approval rating of 75% based on 182 reviews, with a weighted average rating of 6.3/10. The site's critical consensus reads, "Lights Out makes skillful use of sturdy genre tropes—and some terrific performances—for an unsettling, fright-filled experience that delivers superior chills without skimping on story." On Metacritic, the film has a score of 58 out of 100, based on 34 critics, indicating "mixed or average reviews". Audiences polled by CinemaScore gave the film an average grade of "B" on an A+ to F scale.

Lucy O'Brien of IGN gave the film 7/10, saying: "[w]ith an unnerving monster at its core, great cast and relentless final sequence, Light's  Out is a debut director Sandberg should be proud of. A clunky script occasionally loosens its grip on the nerves, but chances are Diana will still have you sleeping with the lights on for a good while after leaving the theatre." Richard Roeper of the Chicago Sun-Times awarded the film 4 stars out of 4, stating: "[e]ven the most cynical, jaded, seen-it-all-before critic cannot deny certain visceral reactions to a film. Lights Out gave me the chills." Justin Lowe of The Hollywood Reporter wrote, "[a] surprisingly maternal horror movie that relies as much on fraying emotional bonds as supernatural suspense to create tension, Lights Out deals with an array of primal fears that threaten to unravel a family's fundamental relationships, along with their sanity." Jeannette Catsoulis of The New York Times wrote, "[s]packling over any copycat cracks with strong acting and fleet editing, Lights Out delivers minimalist frights in old-school ways."

A few critics were less taken with the film. James Berardinelli of Reelviews gave 2 stars out of 4, saying: "[u]nfortunately, the film stumbles, offering too few legitimate scares and displaying an overreliance on traditional horror movie clichés." Berardinelli detested the film's camerawork, described characters as being "thinly drawn", and the screenplay as "spending inordinate amount of time providing a backstory..." Rex Reed of Observer  gave 1 star out of 4, saying: "the film's screenplay focuses almost entirely on the number of resourceful and ingenious ways the characters dream up to keep the lights on, stave off the next attack and stay alive—lights from candles, flashlights, cellphones, the car in the driveway—before the batteries die; The fun wears out fast and so does the "gotcha" factor."

Accolades

Sequel
In July 2016, a week after the film's release, it was announced that New Line Cinema and Warner Bros. Pictures had greenlit a sequel. Heisserer and Sandberg will return to write and direct the film, respectively, while Wan and Lawrence Grey will return to produce under their Atomic Monster Productions and Grey Matter Productions banners.

As of 2022, there has been no update on the sequel's development.

See also 
 List of ghost films

References

External links
 
 
 
 
 
 

2016 films
2016 horror films
American remakes of Swedish films
American supernatural horror films
Features based on short films
Horror film remakes
New Line Cinema films
Dune Entertainment films
American ghost films
2010s monster movies
Films directed by David F. Sandberg
Films produced by James Wan
Films scored by Benjamin Wallfisch
American monster movies
Warner Bros. films
2010s supernatural horror films
2010s ghost films
2016 directorial debut films
2010s English-language films
2010s American films